Wiston is a scattered village and civil parish in the Horsham District of West Sussex, England.

In the 2001 census 221 people lived in 86 households, of whom 120 were economically active.

Landmarks

Chanctonbury Ring, a hill fort based ring of trees atop Chanctonbury Hill on the South Downs, lies on the border of the parish and the neighbouring parish of Washington. Chanctonbury Hill is a Site of Special Scientific Interest as an uncommon woodland type on a chalk escarpment, providing habitat for many species including the protected Great Crested Newt.

References

Horsham District
Villages in West Sussex